ADS 16402 is a binary star system, composed of two sun-like stars located approximately 525 light-years away in the constellation Lacerta. It was first identified as a binary star by John Herschel in 1831. The two stars are separated by 11.26 arcseconds which leads to a projected separation of roughly 1500 astronomical units at the distance of ADS 16402. The star system is estimated to be 1.9 ± 0.6 billion years old. The secondary star ADS 16402 B is also designated HAT-P-1.

Planetary system
On September 14, 2006 the HATNet Project announced their first extrasolar planet discovery HAT-P-1b, a hot jupiter type gas giant in orbit around the secondary star ADS 16402B. Following the designation scheme used by the HATNet Project, the secondary star is known as HAT-P-1, and the planet itself designated HAT-P-1b.

See also
 HATNet Project or HAT

References

External links
 

Binary stars
G-type main-sequence stars
Lacerta (constellation)
Planetary transit variables
Planetary systems with one confirmed planet
F-type main-sequence stars
2